Van Bruggen is a Dutch toponymic surname translating to "from/of [the] bridge[s]". Variant names with the same origin are Ter Brugge(n), Ter Brugghen, Van de(r) Brug, Van der Brugge(n), Van der Brugghen, and Verbrugge(n). Different settlements and houses with the name (de) Brug(ge) ("the bridge") could also be at the source of each family name.  People with these surnames include:

Van Bruggen
 Adolph Cornelis van Bruggen (1929–2016), Dutch malacologist
 Carry van Bruggen (1881–1932), Dutch novelist
 Coosje van Bruggen (1942–2009), Dutch-American sculptor and art historian
 Damian van Bruggen (born 1996), Dutch football defender
 Harry van Bruggen (1927–2010), Dutch amateur botanist
 John van Bruggen, Canadian animation writer and director
Van der Bruggen
 Hannes Van der Bruggen (born 1993), Belgian football midfielder
  (1852–1919), Belgian politician, Minister of Agriculture 1899–1907

Brugghen 
 Hendrick ter Brugghen (1588-1629), Dutch painter
 Joannes van der Brugghen (1639–c.1740), Flemish painter, engraver, art dealer and publisher
 Justinus van der Brugghen (1804–1863), Dutch politician, Prime Minister 1856-58

See also
Galbert van Brugge or "Galbert of Bruges", 12th-century chronicler who lived in Bruges

References

Dutch-language surnames
Toponymic surnames
Surnames of Dutch origin